A by-election was held for the Australian House of Representatives seat of Riverina on 27 February 1965. This was triggered by the resignation of Country Party MP Hugh Roberton.

The by-election was won by Country Party candidate Bill Armstrong.

Results

References

1965 elections in Australia
New South Wales federal by-elections
February 1965 events in Australia